The Crisfield Crabbers were a minor league baseball team based in Crisfield, Maryland. The Crisfield Crabbers teams played as exclusively as members of the Class D level Eastern Shore League from 1922 to 1928 and in 1937, winning the 1926 league championship. Crisfield hosted home minor league games at the Crisfield Ball Park and their final season at Clarke Park. The 1937 Crisfield Crabbers were a minor league affiliate of the New York Giants.

History

Eastern Shore League 1922–1928
Minor league baseball began in Crisfield, Maryland with the 1922 Crisfield Crabbers, who became charter members of the Class D level Eastern Shore League, which began play as a six–team league. Crisfield joined fellow Eastern Shore League charter members Cambridge Canners, Laurel Blue Hens, Parksley Spuds, Pocomoke City Salamanders and Salisbury Indians in beginning league play on June 12, 1922.

In their first season of play, the Crabbers ended the 1922 season with a record of 36–32, placing 3rd, playing the season under manager Jack Ryan. The Crabbers finished 6.5 games behind the champion Parksley Spuds, as the league held no playoffs. Joe Tagg of Crisfield won the Eastern Shore League batting title, hitting .329.

The "Crabbers" moniker was in reference to local industry, as today, Crisfield is still noted as the greatest crab shipping point in the United States. Crisfield Academy and High School continues to use the "Crabbers" moniker today. The city of Crisfield continues to host the annual Crab Derby.

The 1923 Crisfield Crabbers finished last in the final Eastern Shore League standings. Crisfield ended the 1923 season with a record of 26–47, placing sixth as the Eastern Shore League expanded to eight teams to begin the season. However, the Milford Sandpipers withdrew from the league in a dispute over an ineligible player and the Pocomoke City Salamanders folded during the season. Jack Ryan again served as the Crisfield manager, as the Crabbers finished 24.0 games behind the first place Dover Senators.

The Crisfield Crabbers of the 1924 Eastern Shore League ended the season in fourth place. The Crabbers finished with record of 41–39, as Joseph Riley served as manager. In the six–team league, Crisfield finished the season 5.0 games behind the champion Parksley Spuds.

Continuing Eastern Shore League play, the 1925 Crisfield Crabbers finished in fifth place. The Crabbers ended the 1925 season with a record of 42–48 to place 5th in the six–team Eastern Shore League. Martin Breslin and Herb Armstrong served as managers, as Crisfield finished 9.5 games behind the first place Cambridge Canners.

The 1926 Crisfield Crabbers won the Eastern Shore League championship in the six–team league. The Crisfield Crabbers ended the 1926 Eastern Shore League season with a record of 63–21, to place first in the final standings. With Mike Pasquella serving as manager, Crisfield finished 7.0 games ahead of the second place Salisbury Indians. The Easton Yankees were stripped of 34 wins due to roster violations and ended the 1926 season with an official overall record of 24–60.

On August 27, 1926, pitcher William Everham of Crisfield threw a no-hitter against the Salisbury Indians. Crisfield defeated Salisbury 5–0 in the game.

After the conclusion of the 1926 Eastern Shore Season, Crisfield represented the Eastern Shore League in the Five State Championship against the Hagerstown Hubs, champions of the Blue Ridge League. Hagerstown defeated Crisfield 4 games to 2 in the series.

The 1927 Crisfield Crabbers ended the Eastern Shore League regular season with a record of 44–43. The Crabbers placed third in the final standings under returning manager Mike Pasquella, finishing 15.5 games behind the first place Parksley Spuds. Pitcher Cecil Rose of Crisfield led the Eastern Shore League with 17 wins.

The 1928 Eastern Shore League folded during the season. On July 10, 1928, as the league folded, the Crisfield Crabbers had a record of 14–17 under manager Billy Lush. Crisfield was in third place in the standings when the league folded, 8.0 games behind the first place Northampton Red Sox.

Eastern Shore League 1937
The Crabbers returned to play for a final season in 1937. The Eastern Shore League resumed play in 1937 with the Crisfield Crabbers becoming a member once again, joining the eight–team league. Crisfield became an affiliate of the New York Giants. The Crabbers ended the 1937 season with a 40–57 record, placing seventh in the regular season, finishing 19.5 games behind the first place Salisbury Indians, who had 21 wins taken away due to roster violations, but still won the pennant. The 1937 Crabbers were managed by Bob Clark and the returning Mike Pasquella in their final season.

The Crisfield franchise folded from the Eastern Shore League following the 1937 season. Crisfield, Maryland has not hosted another minor league team.

The ballparks
Early Crisfield teams were noted to have played minor league home games at Crisfield Ball Park. The ballpark was located on Cove Street at 1st Street & 2nd Street, Crisfield, Maryland.

In 1937, Crisfield played home minor league games at Clarke Park.

Timeline

Year–by–year records

Notable alumni

Vince Barton (1928)
Alta Cohen (1928)
Bill Knowlton (1922)
Billy Lush (1928, MGR)
Hal Marnie (1937)
Ralph Mattis (1925)
John D. Naylor ( 1922–1923)
Mike Pasquella (1926–1927, 1936, MGR)
Paul Richards (1926–1927) Baltimore Orioles Hall of Fame
Lerton Pinto (1924)
Tony Rensa (1925–1926)
Jack Ryan (1922–1923, MGR)
Rusty Yarnall (1925)

See also
Crisfield Crabbers players

References

External links
Crisfield - Baseball Reference

Professional baseball teams in Maryland
Defunct baseball teams in Maryland
Baseball teams established in 1922
Baseball teams disestablished in 1937
New York Giants minor league affiliates
Defunct Eastern Shore League teams
Crisfield, Maryland
Baseball teams disestablished in 1928
Baseball teams established in 1937